Kriengsak Vimolsate (born 13 August 1942) is a Thai former footballer, who competed in the 1968 Summer Olympics.

References

External links
 

1942 births
Living people
Kriengsak Vimolsate
Kriengsak Vimolsate
Footballers at the 1968 Summer Olympics
Southeast Asian Games medalists in football
Kriengsak Vimolsate
Association football forwards
Competitors at the 1969 Southeast Asian Peninsular Games
Kriengsak Vimolsate
Kriengsak Vimolsate